Grunets is a village in Korsakovsky District of Oryol Oblast, Russia.

References

Rural localities in Oryol Oblast